Salto de Castro, or Poblado del Salto de Castro, is an abandoned village in the municipality of Fonfría, Zamora, Spain. It is located near the Castro Dam, in the lowest part of the Arribes of Douro. According to BBC News, the village is on the market after being empty for 30 years.

References 

Ghost towns in Spain
Municipalities of the Province of Zamora